Last Night in Soho is the compilation soundtrack and film score album to the 2021 psychological horror film of the same name, directed by Edgar Wright. Both the albums were released under the titles: Original Motion Picture Soundtrack and Original Motion Picture Score on 1 November 2021 under the Back Lot Music record label. The former, consists of a compilation of songs inspired from the music in the 1960s, consisting a wide range of genres, while the latter, consisted of tracks from the original score composed by Steven Price. This film marked Price's third collaboration with Wright after The World's End (2012) and Baby Driver (2017). The soundtrack and score, was later released on double vinyl, published by Mondo on 17 and 31 December 2021.

Wright collected samples from several records and cassettes from the 1960s, and had presented a few of the popular tracks to fit in the screenplay, that were later compiled into the album. Those tracks influenced several sequences in the film. The score and soundtrack received positive critical reception, and has received several awards and nominations.

Overview 

Edgar stated in his interview to the Variety saying "it was a real gift, soundtracking it with that period, because I wanted to focus on a certain period of ‘60s music, the mid-‘60s — like ’64-5-6 — and not have so much the psychedelic later ‘60s stuff, because I felt like that had been so well covered. I thought there was something about that moment just before the Summer of Love." He expressed his fascination to 1960s music, from events happened in his life. Speaking to Entertainment Weekly, Wright said "When my older brother was born, at some point my parents stopped buying records. So I was left with one decade to think about, and I would listen to [the records] obsessively," he recalls. "And then their stories about the '60s were incredibly vague, so that made me want to know more and more."

Some of the songs inspired sequences in the film. When Wright heard a cover version of "Wade In The Water" by the Graham Bond Organisation, he "would just start imagining that first dream". Cilla Black's "You're My World" with its dramatic strings conjured up "the sort of the tone and the mood". Most of the songs selected were from the 1960s. Wright also chose "Happy House" by Siouxsie and the Banshees from the 1980s, because "the production on that song is incredible" and it fits a "scene in the movie where they are at a student union Halloween dance". Discussing about the choice of contemporary music, he stated: "I like songs that become famous in a different realm. Like we use "Got My Mind Set on You" the original by James Ray, which most people know as the George Harrison cover. And a lot of people know "Happy House" because the Weeknd sampled it."

A cover of the Petula Clark 1964 international hit "Downtown" was performed by lead actress Taylor-Joy. Her version was released on 22 October 2021. Joy said "It's not every day you're asked to record several versions of an iconic song. The sounds of the '60s was what first made me fall in love with music so I was overjoyed when Edgar asked me to give it a go".

Reception 
A critical reception from Vulture called the film "as a love letter to 60's music" and added it as "Wright’s soundtrack movie, even more so than Baby Driver". Collider reviewed: "What audiences can infer from these songs exactly is unclear, but if Wright’s taste in music says anything, Last Night in Soho is sure to be dripping with sixties glamor — that is, before Eloise finds herself back in time and things go wildly wrong." The Times of India, stated it as "a killer soundtrack that keeps you invested". Den Of Geek reviews stated "Last Night in Soho may well be a modern ghost story classic, but the soundtrack will always be a haunting reminder". Zanobard Reviews wrote about the film's score, saying "Steven Price’s densely atmospheric score for Last Night In Soho is incredibly well made, and while at times it can be a little difficult to listen to (see the rather harsh nature of some of the full-on horror setpieces), the jazzy orchestral style and sheer ambience that grounds the album firmly in 1960s London are frankly a joy to experience, and make the score overall more than worth the price of admission. The orchestral style overall is also truly something to behold as it sounds simply gorgeous throughout, and the way it mixes and changes places with the electronics at various intervals through the score is of particular highlight." InDaily-based Penelope Debelle wrote 'Music is once again the key in Baby Driver director Edgar Wright’s Last Night in Soho. This music-drenched, neon thriller takes us back to Swinging London in the ’60s, reminding us of the uncomplicated pleasures of pop songs".

Last Night in Soho (Original Motion Picture Soundtrack)

Track listing 

 original score track

Charts

Last Night in Soho (Original Motion Picture Score)

Track listing

Charts

Accolades

References

External links 

 
 

2020s film soundtrack albums
2021 soundtrack albums
Film scores
Horror film soundtracks
Back Lot Music soundtracks